Jarno Libert (born 2 May 1997) is a Belgian professional footballer who plays for Lierse Kempenzonen in the Belgian First Division B. 

Libert made his professional debut for OH Leuven on 12 August 2017 in the away match against Roeselare when he was subbed on for Jovan Kostovski. Libert scored the consolation goal on his debut as OH Leuven lost 3–1.

References 

1997 births
Living people
Footballers from Liège
Belgian footballers
Association football midfielders
Oud-Heverlee Leuven players
RWDM47 players
Lierse Kempenzonen players
Challenger Pro League players